The Seminole Inn, also known as the Seminole Country Inn, is a Mission Revival style  historic hotel located at 15885 Southeast Warfield Boulevard in Indiantown, Florida. It was built by S. Davies Warfield, who was president of the Seaboard Air Line Railroad, which developed Indiantown. His niece Wallis Warfield Simpson, later the Duchess of Windsor, was its most famous guest.  On May 31, 2006, it was added to the National Register of Historic Places.

References

External links
 Weekly List Of Actions Taken On Properties: 5/29/06 through 6/02/06 at National Register of Historic Places

Hotel buildings on the National Register of Historic Places in Florida
National Register of Historic Places in Martin County, Florida
Mission Revival architecture in Florida
Spanish Colonial Revival architecture in Florida
Railway hotels in the United States
1926 establishments in Florida